Jesús Savigne (born March 15, 1953 in Santiago de Cuba, Cuba) is a former Cuban volleyball player and now Fenerbahçe SK volleyball branch Youth System Coordinator in Turkey.

Titles 
He won the bronze medal with Cuba at the 1976 Summer Olympic Games. He played for the national team over 200 times.

External links
Fenerbahçe Technical Staff

1953 births
Living people
Volleyball players at the 1976 Summer Olympics
Olympic volleyball players of Cuba
Olympic bronze medalists for Cuba
Cuban men's volleyball players
Fenerbahçe volleyball coaches
Olympic medalists in volleyball
Medalists at the 1976 Summer Olympics
Volleyball players at the 1975 Pan American Games
Medalists at the 1975 Pan American Games
Pan American Games gold medalists for Cuba
Pan American Games medalists in volleyball